Dead Run  may refer to:
 Dead run, running downwind when sailing
 Dead Run (novel), a 2005 novel by P. J. Tracy
 Dead Run (film), a 1967 American-German-French-Italian film
 "Dead Run" (The Twilight Zone), an episode from the 1985 television series The Twilight Zone